Thomas Wentworth may refer to:

 Thomas Wentworth I, MP for Suffolk (UK Parliament constituency)
 Thomas Wentworth, 1st Baron Wentworth (1501–1551), Lord Chamberlain of England
 Thomas Wentworth, 2nd Baron Wentworth (1525–1584), his son, blamed for England's loss of Calais to France in 1558
 Thomas Wentworth (Recorder of Oxford) (c. 1568–1627), English Member of Parliament and lawyer
 Thomas Wentworth (died 1638) (1599–1638), his son, English Member of Parliament and lawyer, MP for Oxford (UK Parliament constituency)
 Thomas Wentworth, 1st Earl of Strafford (1593–1641), English statesman, a major figure in the events leading up to the English Civil War
 Thomas Wentworth, 1st Earl of Cleveland (1591–1667), Royalist military leader during the English Civil War
 Thomas Wentworth, 5th Baron Wentworth (1612–1665), his son, Member of Parliament and also a Royalist military leader
 Thomas Wentworth, 1st Earl of Strafford (1672–1739), KG, diplomat and First Lord of the Admiralty
 Thomas Wentworth (British Army officer) (died 1747), English general officer

See also
Thomas Wentworth Higginson (1823–1911), American minister
 Thomas Watson-Wentworth (1665–1723), English landowner and politician